Jaci may refer to the following places:

 Acireale (Sicilian: Jaciriali, locally shortened to Jaci), Sicily, Italy
 Jaci (river), in Sicilily, Italy
 Jaci, São Paulo, Brazil

See also

 Jasy Jatere, an important figure in Guaraní mythology